Petříček (feminine Petříčková) is a Czech surname meaning literally "small Peter". Notable people include:

 Jan Petříček, Czech slalom canoeist
 Květa Petříčková, Czech field hockey player
 Tomáš Petříček, Czech politician
 Tomáš Petříček (canoeist), Czech slalom canoeist
 Vladimír Petříček, Czech rower

Czech-language surnames
Surnames from given names